The Sır Dam is an arch dam on the Ceyhan River in Kahramanmaraş Province of southern Turkey. There is a hydroelectric power plant, established in 1991, at the dam, with a power output of 285 MW.

Involuntary Resettlement

According to Terminski (2013), the construction of the dam resulted in involuntary resettlement of approximately 45,000 people.

References

Dams in Kahramanmaraş Province
Hydroelectric power stations in Turkey
Arch dams
Dams completed in 1991
Dams on the Ceyhan River
1991 establishments in Turkey
Energy infrastructure completed in 1991